CzechTek was an annual teknival normally held on the weekend at the end of July in the Czech Republic. It attracted thousands of free tekno dancers from several European countries (40,000 people attended in 2003 and 2006). Open invitations were usually made to all sound systems, performers and all people with positive thinking.

History
The first CzechTek was held in 1994 at Hostomice, it was organized by the Spiral Tribe sound system and a group of artists called the Mutoid Waste Company. Various foreign sound systems also attended. The festival was held at the same location the following two years. After that the festival was held in a different location in the Czech Republic each year, usually on ex-military land or in a meadow near a forest. The location of the meeting was always revealed one day before the event on Czech rave websites. Unlike more commercial festivals such as Love Parade or the Street Parade there was little or no organisation, since the idea of free tekno is based on personal freedom and responsibility, although later teknivals required organisation due to large numbers of attendees.

CzechTek 2005

In 2005, the CzechTek festival took place in Mlýnec in Tachov District, close to the German border in the west of the country. The organisers claimed to have permission from the landowner to set up the event, but shortly after the festival began, around 1,000 riot police arrived, using heavy equipment including tear gas, water cannons and the military BVP vehicle. Police cited damage to private property, and argued that the owners of the neighbouring properties had not agreed to allow access to vehicles and that the authorities had not been informed of the event.

The police damaged cars, electronic equipment and other property, and clashes between police and revellers resulted in multiple injuries on both sides. Police used massive amounts of tear gas and stun grenades, broke car windows with iron bars or threw gas grenades in. One participant was killed by a truck on his way to the festival in the early morning hours. Several dozen festival-goers were injured, fifteen seriously, and about fifty policemen were injured, five seriously.

Following the police actions there were protests outside the Czech Interior Ministry. The Czech president Vaclav Klaus criticized the police's use of heavy force. The Prime Minister, Jiří Paroubek, defended the action, declaring that the tekno fans were "not dancing children but dangerous people".

Several months after the clash, all charges against police were dropped, in most cases due to failure to identify individual police officers, and in other cases because it was deemed that an offence had not been committed. In April 2006, there was a march followed by a free party in Strasbourg, France to protest against police repression in general and against the actions of the Czech police in closing CzechTek specifically.

CzechTek 2006
On 14 June 2006 an agreement was signed between the Czech Army and the Association of Czech Sound Systems. The festival was held on land which was part of the Hradiště Military Region. Close cooperation with the state administration caused some resentment among the freetekno community, but the festival went ahead without any repeat of the previous year's violence.

Czechtek discontinued

After the event in 2006, the co-ordinators announced on the official CzechTek website that the festival had been discontinued, stating that "in regard of the fact that the situation around Czechtek isn't bearable anymore, the representatives of the Czech freetekno community came to this radical decision. This year, and very probably even never again, any action of size and under the name Czechtek won't be realized". The reasons given were:
 step-by-step abolition of original thoughts of freetekno
 parasitic behaviour of people not connected to the scene, including many of the visitors themselves
 disability and reluctance to respect the elementary principles of behaviour in shared space

The announcement was signed by: Oktekk, Strahov, NSK, AKA.IO, Komatsu, Spiritual, Mayapur, Layka, Pentatonika, Merkur, Fatal Noise, Matchbox, Luxor, Cirkus Alien, Vosa, Bazooka, Koryto, Shamanic, Zuqwa, Czajovna, Figura, Machine Works, Metro, Ultimate Crew, Basswood, Mutaphone, FDM, Jednota, TMC, NabaziGangoo, Massive Elementz, UANDU Tribe, MHD, Hondzik Sound, Witacid, Iluzor, Detox23, Pandemic, Spectro, Radiator, Swampsound, Gummo, EskanoiZZe, Tsunami, Yaga, Synthetik, MiMiK, Squakka, Mandala, Alkaline, Dynamodestroy, Triptekk, Tekkirk, Remek, FSS, Shadow cabaret, Invaders, Mushroom, Bassmekk, Swazarm, Techamin, Laydakk, Othersidesystem, Inkognito, T2B and others.

See also

 List of electronic music festivals
 Teknival
 Spiral Tribe
 DIY Culture

References

 "Czech PM defends rave crackdown" BBC News, August 2, 2005, retrieved September 29, 2006
 "CzechTek 2006 to be Held Within the Hradiště Military Region" Czech Ministry of Defence, June 15, 2006, retrieved September 29, 2006

External links
 Photos, maps and reports from all years of Czechtek (e-book)
 Photos of first party in Hostomice in 1994
 CzechTek WebLog CzechTek 2005 & Police intervention (Czech)
 CzechTek WebLog in English English section of CzechTek 2005 WebLog
 Czech freetekno party ended by police assault
 Techno festival turns to protest – Police, audience injuries show need for a tactics review, by Matt Reynolds, 3.8.2005, The Prague Post

DIY culture
Music festivals established in 1994
Recurring events disestablished in 2006
Counterculture festivals
Electronic music festivals in the Czech Republic
Free parties
Teknivals
Summer events in the Czech Republic